Phearath Nget (born 27 March 1993) is a Cambodian sprinter. He competed in the 200 metres at the 2015 World Championships in Beijing without advancing from the first  round.

International competitions

Personal bests
100 metres – 10.87 (0.0 m/s, Singapore 2015)
200 metres – 21.89 (0.0 m/s, Gwangju 2015)

References

All-Athletics profile

1993 births
Living people
Place of birth missing (living people)
Cambodian male sprinters
World Athletics Championships athletes for Cambodia
Competitors at the 2015 Summer Universiade